The Leinster Senior Club Football Championship 2009 will be the 42nd staging of the annual Leinster Senior Club Football Championship ran by the Leinster GAA. The competition will see the county champions of eleven counties of Leinsters compete for the title. The Kilkenny Senior Football Championship winners do not take part in the senior championship. The winners will be awarded the Cup and will go on to compete in the 2010 All-Ireland Senior Club Football Championship. The championship is scheduled to start on 25 October 2009 and conclude with the final on 6 December 2009.

Kilmacud Crokes are the current holders – beating ? in the Leinster Senior Club Football Championship 2008 final at ?.

Format
The championship takes the structure of an open-draw knock-out.

Competing teams
Each county in Leinster holds its own County Championship. The winner of the eleven championships qualify for the Leinster Club Championship.

First round

Quarter finals

Semi finals

References

Leinster GAA club football competitions
Leinster Senior Club Football Championship